Kivisaar is an Estonian-language surname. Notable people with the surname include:
Alari Kivisaar, Estonian television personality and nature photographer
Alfred Kivisaar,  Estonian badminton player.

See also

Kivisaari

Estonian-language surnames